The 2012 Prestige Hotels & Resorts Curling Classic was held from September 27 to October 1 at the Vernon Curling Club in Vernon, British Columbia as part of the 2012–13 World Curling Tour. The women's event, was held in a round robin format, and the men's event, held in a triple-knockout format. The purses for the men's and women's were CAD$26,000 and CAD $35,000, respectively.

Men

Teams

Knockout results

A event

B event

C event

Playoffs

Women

Teams

Knockout brackets

A event

B event

C event

Playoffs

External links
Event Home Page

Prestige Hotels and Resorts Curling Classic
Sport in Vernon, British Columbia